6-Benzylaminopurine, benzyl adenine, BAP or BA is a first-generation synthetic cytokinin that elicits plant growth and development responses, setting blossoms and stimulating fruit richness by stimulating cell division.  It is an inhibitor of respiratory kinase in plants, and increases post-harvest life of green vegetables. Influence of cytokinin as 6-benzylaminopurine (BAP) in combination with other methods on postharvest green color retention on broccoli heads and asparagus spears, showed positive results for quality retention. Treatment with 10 and 15 ppm BAP can be used to extend shelf life of fresh-cut broccoli florets and shredded cabbage during storage at 6±1°C at commercial level.

6-Benzylaminopurine was first synthesized and tested in the laboratories of plant physiologist Folke K. Skoog.

See also
Plant hormone
Gibberellic acid

References

Cytokinins
Plant growth regulators
Benzyl compounds